The Monsignor Martin Athletic Association is an athletic league founded in 1948 and comprising Catholic high schools and two private secular schools.  Member schools compete for the Supremacy Cup, awarded to the school in each division that wins the most championships during a school year.

For each sport, the league is divided by two divisions - Class AA (large schools) and Class A (small schools). All but two of the schools are located in Erie County, New York.

Member schools include

Boys
Bishop Timon - St. Jude High School
Canisius High School
Saint Francis High School
St. Joseph's Collegiate Institute

Girls
The Buffalo Seminary
Mount Mercy Academy
Mount Saint Mary Academy
Nardin Academy
Buffalo Academy of the Sacred Heart

Co-Educational
Archbishop Walsh High School (in Cattaraugus County)
Cardinal O'Hara High School
Nichols School (private/grades 5–12)
St. Mary's High School
The Park School of Buffalo (private)

Former Member Institutions
Bishop Colton High School
Bishop Fallon High School
Bishop Gibbons High School
Bishop McMahon High School
Bishop Neumann High School
Bishop O'Hern High School
Bishop Ryan High School (-1971)
Calasanctius Preparatory School
Cardinal Dougherty High School
DeSales Catholic High School
Father Baker High School
Holy Angels Academy (-2014)
 Immaculate Heart of Mary, Villa Maria (-2004)
Immaculata Academy (-2016)
Mount Saint Joseph's Academy
Niagara Catholic High School (in Niagara County), merged from Madonna and Bishop Duffy (-2018)
Stella Niagara Seminary
Turner-Carroll High School (1960-2003), merged from Archbishop Carroll and Bishop Turner

References

High school sports associations in the United States
Sports in New York (state)